The 2000 Royal Bank Cup was the 30th Junior "A" 2000 ice hockey National Championship for the Canadian Junior A Hockey League.

The Royal Bank Cup was competed for by the winners of the Doyle Cup, Anavet Cup, Dudley Hewitt Cup, and Fred Page Cup and a host city.

The tournament was hosted by the Fort McMurray Oil Barons and Fort McMurray, Alberta.

The Playoffs

Round Robin

Results
Battlefords North Stars defeat Fort McMurray Oil Barons 2-1
Rayside-Balfour Sabrecats defeat Chilliwack Chiefs 8-7 in Double Overtime
Fort McMurray Oil Barons defeat Cornwall Colts 5-2
Rayside-Balfour Sabrecats defeat Battlefords North Stars 4-2
Chilliwack Chiefs defeat Cornwall Colts 3-2
Fort McMurray Oil Barons defeat Rayside-Balfour Sabrecats 4-3
Battlefords North Stars defeat Cornwall Colts 4-3 in Overtime
Fort McMurray Oil Barons defeat Chilliwack Chiefs 4-3
Rayside-Balfour Sabrecats defeat Cornwall Colts 5-4
Chilliwack Chiefs defeat Battlefords North Stars 5-2

Semi-finals and Final

Bronze Medal Game
Chilliwack Chiefs defeat Battlefords North Stars 3-2 in Double Overtime

Awards
Most Valuable Player: Serge Dube (Rayside-Balfour Sabrecats)
Top Scorer: Serge Dube (Rayside-Balfour Sabrecats) and Kevin Estrada (Chilliwack Chiefs)
Most Sportsmanlike Player: Craig Strain (Fort McMurray Oil Barons)
Top Goalie: Steven Nelson (North Battleford North Stars)
Top Forward: Colin Murphy (Fort McMurray Oil Barons)
Top Defenceman: Troy Turyk (Rayside-Balfour Sabrecats)

Roll of League Champions
AJHL: Fort McMurray Oil Barons
BCHL: Chilliwack Chiefs
CJHL: Cornwall Colts
MJHL: OCN Blizzard
MJAHL: Halifax Oland Exports
NOJHL: Rayside-Balfour Sabrecats
OPJHL: Brampton Capitals
QJAAAHL: Coaticook Frontaliers
SJHL: North Battleford North Stars

See also
Canadian Junior A Hockey League
Royal Bank Cup
Anavet Cup
Doyle Cup
Dudley Hewitt Cup
Fred Page Cup

External links
Royal Bank Cup Website

2000
Royal Bank Cup
Fort McMurray